Gabriel Frasca is an American chef.

Biography
Frasca began cooking at the age of 15 on the North Shore of Massachusetts, but went to Kenyon College study journalism. Later on, he decided to become a chef, and by the age of 20 he was cooking French cuisine for James Beard Award winner named Gordon Hamersley at Hamersley's Bistro. In 1996 he got a job at the Chez Henri in Cambridge, Massachusetts where he worked with Paul O'Connell and Amanda Lydon. By 1997 he and Lydon went to Provence, France where he worked at the L’abbaye de Saint Croix. Later, he worked with Michellin three-star chef Martin Berasategui in San Sebastián, Spain. He then went to Dolomites restaurant in Italy and worked there with Norbert Neiderkofler at St. Hubertus, who, while he was there, got his first Michelin star.

In the same place he met an American chef named David Bouley who invited him to help him to open a restaurant in New York City called Danube. In 1999, Frasca moved to Manhattan and spent time at Bouley Bakery (which earned a four-star rating from The New York Times) before the opening of Danube (which received three). In 2000 he returned to Boston and got his first chef position. In 2001, he was hired by his friend Seth Woods, at the just-opened Aquitaine Bis. The same year he was recognized by The Improper Bostonian newspaper as Boston’s 2001 Rising Star and started working at the Radius restaurant which was owned by Michael Schlow. While Frasca was there, the restaurant won the Best Overall Restaurant Award from the Boston Magazine and was put into top 25 restaurants by the Gourmet. In November 2003, Frasca took over Spire restaurant,  couple of years later the Boston Magazine named him Best Chef, Up and Coming. He was also awarded with three stars from the Boston Globe. In 2006, he and Lydon became a co-Executive Chefs of the Straight Wharf Restaurant in Nantucket, Massachusetts which opened on July 4, 1976, and the same year Frasca was awarded with the Rising Stars Award. He also appeared on Fetch With Ruff Ruffman Episode 15, Season 1 "Tryin' Chef."

References

American chefs
American male chefs
Living people
20th-century births
Year of birth missing (living people)
Kenyon College alumni